Ricinoides is an arthropod genus in the family Ricinoididae, first described by Henry Ewing in 1929.

Distribution 
Species in this genus are found in West Africa.

Species 
 it contains sixteen species:

 Ricinoides afzelii (Thorell, 1892) — Ghana, Guinea, Sierra Leone
 Ricinoides atewa Naskrecki, 2008 — Ghana
 Ricinoides crassipalpe (Hansen & Sørensen, 1904) — Cameroon, Equatorial Guinea
 Ricinoides eburneus Botero-Trujillo, Sain & Prendini, 2021 — Côte d’Ivoire
 Ricinoides feae (Hansen, 1921) — Guinea, Guinea-Bissau
 Ricinoides hanseni Legg, 1976 — Sierra Leone
 Ricinoides iita Botero-Trujillo, Sain & Prendini, 2021 — Nigeria
 Ricinoides kakum Botero-Trujillo, Sain & Prendini, 2021 — Ghana
 Ricinoides karschii (Hansen & Sørensen, 1904) — Cameroon, Congo, Gabon
 Ricinoides leonensis Legg, 1978 — Sierra Leone
 Ricinoides megahanseni Legg, 1982 — Côte d’Ivoire
 Ricinoides nzerekorensis Botero-Trujillo, Sain & Prendini, 2021 — Guinea
 Ricinoides olounoua Legg, 1978 — Cameroon
 Ricinoides sjostedtii (Hansen & Sørensen, 1904) — Cameroon, Nigeria
 Ricinoides taii Botero-Trujillo, Sain & Prendini, 2021 — Côte d’Ivoire
 Ricinoides westermannii (Guérin-Méneville, 1838) — Côte d’Ivoire, Ghana, Togo

References 

Arachnid genera
Ricinulei
Arachnids of Africa